CNJ can refer to:
 The National Justice Council of Brazil
 Central Railroad of New Jersey
Central Railroad of New Jersey 113
 The College of New Jersey, commonly abbreviated as TCNJ or CNJ.
 Camden New Journal, a free newspaper in the London Borough of Camden
 Chick'n Joy, a fastfood restaurant 
 Chun Nan Jun, a Chinese auto manufacturer
 Cloncurry Airport, IATA airport code "CNJ"